Mason Cerruto (born 22 January 1996) is an Italy international rugby league footballer who most recently played for the Canterbury-Bankstown Bulldogs in the NSW Cup. He was a member of Italy's squad for the 2017 World Cup.

Early life
Cerruto was born in Sydney, New South Wales, Australia. He is of Italian descent

He played his junior rugby league for the Camden Rams.

Playing career

Early years
Cerruto began the 2015 season playing for the Wests Tigers in the NYC before moving to the Parramatta Eels mid-season. Cerruto was a regular for the Eels in the NYC in 2016, playing a total of 20 games. At the end of the season, Cerruto represented Italy in all 3 of their 2017 World Cup qualifying matches, scoring 4 tries against Serbia and 2 against Russia.

Cerruto joined the Penrith Panthers in 2017 and spent much of the season playing for their third-tier team, the St Marys Saints, in the Ron Massey Cup, but was called upon to play in the second-tier New South Wales Cup for Penrith on a couple of occasions, including in their grand final win over the Wyong Roos. In October, Cerruto was named in Italy's squad for the 2017 World Cup. After the World Cup, Cerruto signed a one year contract with the Canterbury-Bankstown Bulldogs with an option in the club's favour for 2019.

In 2022, Cerruto joined the Camden Rams of the Macarthur Conference as Captain/Coach.

International caps

References

External links
Canterbury Bulldogs profile
2017 RLWC profile

1996 births
Living people
Australian rugby league players
Australian people of Italian descent
Italy national rugby league team players
Rugby league wingers
Rugby league fullbacks
Rugby league centres
Rugby league players from Sydney